The following is a list of ice hockey teams in Nova Scotia, past and present. It includes the league(s) they play for, and championships won.

Professional

American Hockey League

Junior

Quebec Major Junior Hockey League

Maritime Junior A Hockey League

Junior B Hockey Leagues

Junior C Hockey Leagues

Semi-professional, senior and amateur

Senior

University

League, regional and national championships

See also

Hockey Nova Scotia
Coloured Hockey League
2000 Memorial Cup
2003 World Junior Ice Hockey Championships
2004 Women's World Ice Hockey Championships
2008 Men's World Ice Hockey Championships with Québec City, Québec as the co-host.

References

Nova Scotia teams

Ice hockey teams
Ice hockey teams in Nova Scotia